Deepani Silva also known as Deepani de Silva is a Sri Lankan popular veteran film and teledrama actress. She made it to the  films after appearing in several street dramas and plays. On 28 May 2018, Deepani Silva was arrested and was released on bail for involving in an accident in Bandaragama.

Biography 
Deepani Silva is the only film artist in her family. Her father, D. Peter Silva was a trade union leader. She finished her higher education at the Buddhist Ladies' College which is situated in Colombo.

Career 
She started her acting career in 1975 through acting in street dramas. To learn her acting, Deepani joined veteran theatre actor Dhamma Jagoda's theatre school, Lionel Wendt Kala Kendra Ranga Shilpa Shalika which was inaugurated by Dhamma Jagoda as Sri Lanka's first ever theatre school. She learnt acting in the Ranga Shilpa Shalika from late Gamini Haththotuwegama who is still considered as the father of Sri Lankan street theatre.

She acted in several teledrama serials including Doo Daruwo, Ammai Thaththai, Hathpana, Lokke Mama, Abuddassa Kolama, Thanradevi in the early 1990s before gaining opportunities to step her foot in Sinhala film industry. Deepani Silva made her film debut in 1994 through Mee Haraka.

Deepani also acted in supportive roles during her career including her role as the mother of spoilt son in the 2008 blockbuster film, Machan which portrays the real story of the Sri Lankan handball team which disappeared in 2004 in Germany. She also featured in as one of the members of the cast in the 2018 horror film, Seya which is historically the first all-female featured movie in Sri Lankan film industry.

Arrest 

On 28 May 2018 (Monday) by the time when she was driving the car, she was reported to have met with an accident in the Bandaragama-Kesbewa road in the morning around 6.40am by colliding with a three wheeler. She was charged by the Bandaragama Police and was arrested in connection with the accident which also resulted in critical injuries to a 10-year-old girl who travelled with her father in the three-wheeler. On the same day, she was produced before the Panadura Magistrate and was released on bail with strict conditions. The Magistrate Court also ordered to impound the driving license of Deepani Silva and released her by imposing a personal surety of Rs. 200, 000.

Filmography

See also 
 List of Sri Lankan actors

References

External links 
 

Date of birth missing (living people)
Place of birth missing (living people)
Sinhalese actresses
Sri Lankan film actresses
Sri Lankan stage actresses
Sri Lankan television actresses
20th-century Sri Lankan actresses
21st-century Sri Lankan actresses
Living people
Year of birth missing (living people)